Michael Muller Brink (born 24 September 1996 in Pretoria, South Africa) is a South African rugby union player who most recently played with the . He can play as a fly-half, fullback or inside centre.

Career

Border

In 2013, he played at the Under-18 Academy Week tournament, scoring tries against Limpopo and the Blue  and scored 19 points with the boot to achieve a personal points haul of 29 points, the joint-sixth highest at the tournament.

He again represented the Border Under-18 side in 2014, this time at the premier South African high school competition, the Under-18 Craven Week held in Middelburg. He scored a hat-trick of tries in their match against Limpopo in a 78–17 win, which also meant he scored against the same opponents in three tournaments running.

Eastern Province Kings

After school, Brink moved to Port Elizabeth to join the  academy. He was included in the  squad that participated in Group A of the 2015 Under-19 Provincial Championship. He started matches in a variety of positions – fly-half, inside centre and fullback – during the season, and was also the main kicker for the team, eventually scoring 115 points, second only to Western Province's Tiaan Swanepoel.

In March 2016, Brink was included in a training squad for the South Africa Under-20 squad prior to the 2016 World Rugby Under 20 Championship, but he was not included in a reduced provisional announced squad a week later.

References

South African rugby union players
Living people
1996 births
Rugby union players from Pretoria
Rugby union fly-halves
Rugby union centres
Rugby union fullbacks
Eastern Province Elephants players